Roberto Andrés Depietri (10 October 1965 – 4 June 2021) was an Argentine footballer and representative of players who was mostly distinguished in his career playing for the Bahía Blanca Club Olimpo. He was an attacking midfielder and sometimes a winger. Between 2017 and 2018, he was secretary of Club de Gimnasia y Esgrima La Plata and also represented international player Rodrigo Palacio.

Career
Depietri was born in Darwin, Río Negro in 1965.

Depietri played in both his native Argentina and Mexico, playing in Argentina mostly for Club Olimpo of Bahía Blanca and Club de Gimnasia y Esgrima La Plata. Between 1994 and 1995 he also played for Talleres de Córdoba and briefly in 1996 for Unión de Santa Fe before retiring in Club Olimpo in 1997. In Mexico, Depietri played for Deportivo Toluca for four years between 1990 and 1994 and Club Universidad Nacional between 1995 and 1996.

Death
Depietri contracted COVID-19 in May 2021, and died from the disease on 4 June 2021, aged 55, in Bahía Blanca, Buenos Aires Province.

References

1965 births
2021 deaths
Argentine footballers
Association football midfielders
Olimpo footballers
Club de Gimnasia y Esgrima La Plata footballers
Deportivo Toluca F.C. players
Talleres de Córdoba footballers
Club Universidad Nacional footballers
Unión de Santa Fe footballers
People from Río Negro Province
Deaths from the COVID-19 pandemic in Argentina